Little Mouse on the Prairie is a 26 episode animated series made by the cooperation of the US and China, loosely based on the Serendipity book by Stephen Cosgrove with the same title. The story features a city mouse named Osgood Dee who just moved to the countryside Squeaky Corners to live at his uncle's farm. Each show focuses on Osgood Dee and a group of animal friends he met at the farm. This is the second adaptation of a Serendipity book as the first adaptation was the 1983 anime series Serendipity the Pink Dragon.

Ownership of the series passed to Disney in 2001 when Disney acquired Fox Kids Worldwide, which also includes Saban Entertainment. The series is not available on Disney+.

Characters

Kids 
 Osgood Dee - Main character of the series and the leader of his friends.
 Tweezle Dee - Osgood's cousin.
 Blossom - A rabbit who is in love with Osgood.
 Jeremiah - A frog.
 Flaps - A duck.
 Sweeny - A weasel.

Cats 
 B.C. - A fat cat
 Cal - B.C.'s roommate, a thin cat.

Other 
 R.D. - Osgood's uncle and Tweezle's father.
 Molly Dee - Osgood's aunt and Tweezle's mother.
 Betty Dee - Tweezle's baby sister.
 Grandpa Whiskers - An old wise mouse.

Episodes

DVD releases
In 2004, 2 DVDs which each contained 3 episodes were released in German. The release of the rest of the series is unknown.

In 2011, the series was released on DVD (Region ALL, NTSC format) in China. A set of 5 disc features all episodes in Mandarin Chinese dialogue or English language and with optional Chinese subtitles.

See also
 Serendipity the Pink Dragon - first adaptation of the Serendipity book series.

References

External links
 Little Mouse on the Prairie on TVGuide.com
 China Network Television: Little Mouse on the Prairie by China Central Television
 Little Mouse on the Prairie on Big Cartoon DataBase
 

1996 American television series debuts
1996 American television series endings
1996 Chinese television series debuts
1996 Chinese television series endings
1990s American animated television series
Australian Broadcasting Corporation original programming
Chinese children's animated adventure television series
Chinese children's animated comedy television series
Television series by Saban Entertainment
Fox Family Channel original programming
Fox Kids
Fox Broadcasting Company original programming
American children's animated adventure television series
American children's animated comedy television series
Animated television series about mice and rats